Cain's Way may refer to:

 Cain's Cutthroats, or Cain's Way, a 1971 western-themed exploitation film
 Cain's Way (album), an album by the Polish death metal band Hate